Edmund Boyle may refer to:

Edmund Boyle, 7th Earl of Cork and 7th Earl of Orrery (1742–1798)
Edmund Boyle, 8th Earl of Cork and 8th Earl of Orrery (1767–1856)